Dunn Field may refer to several stadiums, including:

 Dunn Field (Elmira), a stadium in Elmira, New York, primarily used for baseball
 The 1921–1927 name for League Park in Cleveland, Ohio, mostly demolished in 1951